Yousif Jaber Naser Al-Hammadi (born February 25, 1985) is an association football player from the United Arab Emirates who plays for Shabab Al-Ahli. He is a left foot player and handle main position on the field as left back and other position at left midfield.

References

External links 
 
 

1985 births
Living people
Emirati footballers
United Arab Emirates international footballers
Baniyas Club players
Al Ahli Club (Dubai) players
Shabab Al-Ahli Club players
2011 AFC Asian Cup players
UAE First Division League players
UAE Pro League players
Footballers at the 2006 Asian Games
Association football midfielders
Asian Games competitors for the United Arab Emirates
2007 AFC Asian Cup players